Louisiana Creole can refer to:
 Louisiana Creole people
 Louisiana Creole language
 Louisiana Creole cuisine